Effingham Academy was founded on June 18, 1819 in Effingham, New Hampshire and opened in a new school building in 1820. Rev. Thomas Jameson A.M. was preceptor. A normal school for the training of teachers was established on the school building's second floor in 1830. James W. Bradbury, a Bowdoin graduate, headed it. After 1845 the building became a district schoolhouse. The school was in what is now the Lord's Hill Historic District. Alumni include Amos Tuck. The building is now a Effingham Historical Society property.

References

1819 establishments in New Hampshire
Educational institutions established in 1819
Schools in Carroll County, New Hampshire